The Andirá River is a river of Pará state in north-central Brazil.

See also
List of rivers of Pará

References

Rivers of Pará